Jeremiah Powell   was a Massachusetts politician who served as a member, and the second President of, the Massachusetts Senate.

Massachusetts Senate
Powell was elected the President of the Massachusetts Senate on November 4, 1780 to fill the position after Thomas Cushing resigned to become the Lieutenant Governor of Massachusetts.

Notes

Massachusetts state senators
Presidents of the Massachusetts Senate
18th-century American politicians